Pomponesco is a comune in the Italian Province of Mantua. As of 2007, the estimated population of Pomponesco was 1,770.

The experimental musical artist Maurizio Bianchi was born there in 1955.

Sources

Cities and towns in Lombardy